The 1960 Boston University Terriers football team was an American football team that represented Boston University as an independent during the 1960  NCAA University Division football season. In its fourth season under head coach Steve Sinko, the team compiled a 3–5–2 record and was outscored by a total of 172 to 30.

Schedule

References

Boston University
Boston University Terriers football seasons
Boston University Terriers football